Sulky Gully was the location of a gold discovery in the 1860s near what is now Ballarat, Victoria.

History of Ballarat